A  Prayer book is a book listing prayers. Prayer book may also refer to:
Operation Prayer Book, a series of four operation orders carried out during the United States invasion of Panama
Prayer Book Rebellion, a popular revolt in Cornwall and Devon in 1549 as a result of the Book of Common Prayer (BCP)
Prayer Book Society of Canada, an organization within the Anglican Church of Canada which promotes the understanding and use of the BCP